Irepodun is a Local Government Area in Osun State, Nigeria. Its headquarters are in the town of Ilobu,.

It has an area of 64 km and a population of 119,497 at the 2006 census.

The postal code of the area is 230.

References

Local Government Areas in Osun State
Local Government Areas in Yorubaland